is a Japanese amateur road and track cyclist. She won three bronze medals in women's road time trial, individual pursuit, and points race at the Asian Championships (2006 and 2007), and later represented Japan at the 2008 Summer Olympics.

Wadami qualified for the Japanese squad in the women's points race at the 2008 Summer Olympics in Beijing by claiming a gold medal and receiving a berth from the UCI "B" World Championships in Cape Town, South Africa. Wadami did not finish the grueling 25-km Olympic sprint race in a field of twenty-two cyclists, after she suddenly crashed and fell off the track, leaving her distraught and injured.

Career highlights

2006
  Asian Championships (ITT), Kuala Lumpur (MAS)
 2nd Overall, Tour de Okinawa, Japan
 3rd Japanese Championships (Road), Japan
2007
  UCI B World Championships (Points race), Cape Town (RSA)
  UCI B World Championships (Scratch), Cape Town (RSA)
  UCI B World Championships (Pursuit), Cape Town (RSA)
  UCI B World Championships (Keirin), Cape Town (RSA)
  Asian Championships (Points race), Bangkok (THA)
  Asian Championships (Pursuit), Bangkok (THA)

References

External links
NBC 2008 Olympics profile

1987 births
Living people
Japanese female cyclists
Japanese track cyclists
Cyclists at the 2008 Summer Olympics
Cyclists at the 2006 Asian Games
Olympic cyclists of Japan
Sportspeople from Tottori Prefecture
Asian Games competitors for Japan
20th-century Japanese women
21st-century Japanese women